was a town located in Amakusa District, Kumamoto Prefecture, Japan.

As of 2003, the town had an estimated population of 17,017 and a density of 448.05 persons per km2. The total area was 37.98 km2.

On March 31, 2004, Ōyano, along with the towns of Himedo, Matsushima and Ryūgatake (all from Amakusa District), was merged to create the city of Kami-Amakusa and no longer exists as an independent municipality.

The main island comprising Oyano is still called Oyano Island, and is connected to mainland Kyushu by the first of the "Amakusa Five Bridges", Tenmonbashi. Oyano is connected to the rest of Kami-Amakusa City by the second through fifth bridges: Oyanobashi, Nakanobashi, Maejimabashi, and Matsushimabashi.

Oyano Island is home to the Amakusa Shiro Memorial Hall, a museum that documents the history of the Amakusa-Shimabara Rebellion of 1637.

Notes

External links

 Official website of Kami-Amakusa 
 

Dissolved municipalities of Kumamoto Prefecture